The name "Welsh Highland Railway (Caernarfon)", or WHR(C), was the name given to the operation by the Festiniog Railway Company of the railway services during the ongoing reconstruction of the line of the old Welsh Highland Railway.

This was to distinguish it from the operations of the Welsh Highland Railway Limited, owners, and operators of a section of line in Porthmadog, which was known as Welsh Highland Railway (Porthmadog).

From 2009, the WHR(C) operation became the Welsh Highland Railway, whilst the WHR(P) operation was renamed Welsh Highland Heritage Railway

For further information see Welsh Highland Railway

See also 
Festiniog Railway Company
Ffestiniog Railway
Welsh Highland Railway
Welsh Highland Railway (Porthmadog)

Welsh Highland Railway